CBV may refer to:
 Chartered Business Valuator (CBV), a professional business valuation designation offered by the CBV Institute.
 Call by value evaluation
 Callback verification for e-mail
 Cannabivarin
 CBV, a chemotherapy regimen (the letters each denoting a different drug)
 CBV-FM, a radio station in Quebec affiliated with Première Chaîne
 Cerebral blood volume, which can be measured by FMRI and is closely linked to cerebral blood flow
 Chillon–Byron–Villeneuve tramway, a former tramway in the Swiss canton of Vaud
 Chứng khoán Biển Việt or Bien Viet Securities, an investment bank of Vietnam, is the world's largest provider of Vietnam's financial market indexes and economic indicators, such as CBV Index or CBV Total
 Confederação Brasileira de Voleibol, national governing body for volleyball in Brazil
 Coxsackie B virus
 CBV, a file extension used for ChessBase Archive files